Donetske may refer to the following places in Ukraine:

Donetske, Donetsk Oblast, urban-type settlement in Kramatorsk Raion
Donetske, Kharkiv Oblast, village in Izium Raion